Dadia (Greek: Δαδιά) is a village in the northwestern part of the Evros regional unit, Eastern Macedonia and Thrace, Greece. Dadia is in the municipality of Soufli.  Its population in 2011 was 533 for the village and 546 for the community, including the village Kotronia. It is located southwest of Soufli and north of Feres. The name originates from a resinous pine wood which in the past was used for lighting.

Population

Geography 

Dadia is situated on the western edge of the lower Evros valley, at the foot of wooded hills.  Dadia Forest is a well known nature reserve, in which endangered species of birds of prey, including Aquila heliaca and Aquila pomarina, find refuge.

Gallery

See also

 List of settlements in the Evros regional unit

External links
 The Dadia forest at the Greek WWF site 
 Dadia on GTP Travel Pages

References

Populated places in Evros (regional unit)